Libertas (Latin for 'liberty' or 'freedom') is the Roman goddess and personification of liberty. She became a politicised figure in the Late Republic, featured on coins supporting the populares faction, and later those of the assassins of Julius Caesar. Nonetheless, she sometimes appears on coins from the imperial period, such as Galba's "Freedom of the People" coins during his short reign after the death of Nero. She is usually portrayed with two accoutrements: the rod and the soft pileus, which she holds out, rather than wears.

The Greek equivalent of the goddess Libertas is Eleutheria, the personification of liberty.  There are many post-classical depictions of liberty as a person which often retain some of the iconography of the Roman goddess.

Etymology 
The name Lībertās ('freedom') is a derivation from Latin Līber ('free'), stemming from Proto-Italic *leuþero, and ultimately from Proto-Indo-European *h₁leudʰero ('belonging to the people', hence 'free').

Attributes
Libertas was associated with the pileus, commonly worn by the freed slave:

Libertas was also recognized in ancient Rome by the rod (vindicta or festuca), used ceremonially in the act of Manumissio vindicta, Latin for 'freedom by the rod' (emphasis added):

Temples 
The Roman Republic was established simultaneously with the creation of Libertas and is associated with the overthrow of the Tarquin kings. She was worshiped by the Junii, the family of Marcus Junius Brutus.
In 238 BC, before the Second Punic War, Tiberius Sempronius Gracchus built a temple to Libertas on the Aventine Hill. Census tables were stored inside the temple's atrium. A subsequent temple was built (58–57 BC) on Palatine Hill, another of the Seven hills of Rome, by Publius Clodius Pulcher. By building and consecrating the temple on the site of the former house of then-exiled Cicero, Clodius ensured that the land was legally uninhabitable. Upon his return, Cicero successfully argued that the consecration was invalid and thus managed to reclaim the land and destroy the temple. In 46 BC, the Roman Senate voted to build and dedicate a shrine to Libertas in recognition of Julius Caesar, but no temple was built; instead, a small statue of the goddess stood in the Roman Forum.

Post-classical

The goddess Libertas is also depicted on the Great Seal of France, created in 1848. This is the image which later influenced French sculptor Frédéric Auguste Bartholdi in the creation of his statue of Liberty Enlightening the World.

Libertas, along with other Roman goddesses, has served as the inspiration for many modern-day personifications, including the Statue of Liberty on Liberty Island in the United States. According to the National Park Service, the Statue's Roman robe is the main feature that invokes Libertas and the symbol of Liberty from which the statue derives its name.

In addition, money throughout history has borne the name or image of Libertas.  As "Liberty", Libertas was depicted on the obverse (heads side) of most coinage in the U.S. into the twentieth century and the image is still used for the American Gold Eagle gold bullion coin.  The University of North Carolina records two instances of private banks in its state depicting Libertas on their banknotes; Libertas is depicted on the 5, 10 and 20 Rappen denomination coins of Switzerland, and on the privately issued 50 Goldback notes.

The symbolic characters Columbia who represents the United States and Marianne, who represents France, the Statue of Liberty (Liberty Enlightening the World) in New York Harbor, and many other characters and concepts of the modern age were created, and are seen, as embodiments of Libertas.

See also
Liber
Libera (mythology) a goddess in Roman mythology
Liberty Leading the People, 1830 painting

References

Bibliography

External links

 David Hackett Fischer, Liberty and Freedom (2005) The many faces of Miss Liberty

Roman goddesses
Personifications in Roman mythology
Liberty symbols